Cecil Harland Underwood (November 5, 1922 – November 24, 2008) was an American Republican Party politician from West Virginia, known for the length of his career.

He was the 25th and 32nd Governor of West Virginia from 1957 to 1961, and from 1997 to 2001. He ran for re-election in 2000 but was defeated by Democrat Bob Wise. Underwood was both the youngest and the oldest person ever to serve as Governor of West Virginia. He was also the first guest on the television game show To Tell the Truth. He was a Methodist.

Biography

Early life
Underwood was born in 1922 in Josephs Mills, West Virginia, the son of Della N. (née Forrester) and Silas Henry Underwood. He labored on farms during The Great Depression. He graduated from Tyler County High School in 1939.

After graduation, he became an Army reservist during World War II before enrolling in Salem College in Harrison County. He graduated in 1943, where he had been elected president of the student body and a member of Sigma Phi Epsilon fraternity.

After college, he taught high school biology in St. Marys, Pleasants County, West Virginia from 1943 to 1946.

While at Salem College, he met his future wife, Hovah Hall through her two sisters who were his classmates. They were wed on July 25, 1948 at Knotts Methodist Church in Grantsville.

From 1946 to 1950, Underwood taught at Marietta College in Marietta, Ohio. He then served as Vice President of Salem College from 1950 to 1956. Nine years later he received a master's degree from West Virginia University.

At the age of 22, Underwood entered politics by running as a Republican for the West Virginia House of Delegates, winning six terms from 1944 to 1956. He served as House Minority Leader in 1949, 1951, 1953 and 1955.

First term as governor
Underwood's 1956 election as Governor of West Virginia marked the first election of a Republican to the office since 1928. He had defeated Charleston Mayor John T. Copenhaver by only 7,200 votes in the primary, and had made a decisive victory against Democratic U.S. Representative Robert Mollohan in the general election by 63,000 votes. Only a week prior to the election, it was discovered that Mollohan had received $20,000 and two cars from a coal operator on a strip mine at a male reformatory in Pruntytown while Mollohan was superintendent of the institution. Underwood had turned 34 years old only one day before the election, making him one of the youngest U.S. governors to have ever been elected.

Following the lead of Governor William C. Marland, the Democrat who preceded him in office, Underwood continued the desegregation of West Virginia schools without violent confrontation at all levels and was a supporter of civil rights legislation.

The previous governors since 1932 had all been Democrats. His first act as governor was to go on the new medium of television and inform every state employee that they were fired. He stated that this was the only way to destroy the corrupt "machine" system. He later advocated an organized civil service and retirement pension system, and provided temporary employment relief for low-income families.

Underwood was instrumental in the creation of the West Virginia Mental Health Department, and oversaw creation of the interstate highway in the state, He oversaw the last three executions in the state, all in 1959.

Activities in between terms as governor
Because West Virginia's state Constitution prohibited governors from serving consecutive terms at that time, Underwood ran for the United States Senate in 1960, but was defeated by incumbent Democrat Jennings Randolph. He was nominated again for governor in 1964 but was defeated again, and then lost the Republican primary for governor to Arch A. Moore Jr. in 1968. He was nominated again for governor in 1976, losing to Democrat Jay Rockefeller by 250,000 votes, which would become his largest defeat.

During the 1960s, he was named temporary chairman of the Republican National Convention and was once considered for the office of Vice President under Richard Nixon. Two weeks after losing the Senate race in 1960, Underwood went to work for the Island Creek Coal Company and Monsanto Chemical Company as well as forming his own land development company.

He was associated as well with the Software Valley Corporation in Morgantown, West Virginia. He continued his academic career by serving as President of Bethany College and instructor of political science at Marshall University. He also served as president of the National Association of State Councils on Vocational Education.

Second term as governor

Underwood was elected again to the office of Governor of West Virginia in 1996 under the banner "Better Government, not Bigger Government", carrying 38 of the state's 55 counties and defeating Astronaut Jon McBride and David McKinley.

During his governorship, he enabled the Governor's Commission of Fair Taxation, which was a thorough review of the state's tax structure. The Commission made numerous recommendations for improvement. He streamlined administrative costs from education and other government sectors.

In October 1999, Underwood was selected by the Governors of the Appalachian states to serve as West Virginia's co-chairman for the Appalachian Regional Commission for 2000.

Underwood was the only sitting Republican governor defeated for re-election in 2000, narrowly losing to Democrat Bob Wise.

Post-political career
His wife, Hovah, died on September 24, 2004, from complications of a stroke.

In March 2006, Underwood suffered a minor stroke and was hospitalized several times after that. In early 2008, Underwood suffered a major stroke and lost the ability to formulate speech; he later had a severe blood infection.

In June, he was admitted to a nursing facility before returning to his Charleston residence, where he received round-the-clock care. On November 23, Underwood was admitted to the Charleston Area Medical Center's Memorial Hospital with chest congestion and doctors found some slight bleeding in the brain. He died the following day.

He is survived by one son, two daughters, and six grandchildren. His body was donated to Marshall University's Joan C. Edwards School of Medicine.

Notes

References

External links

Biography of Cecil H. Underwood
Inaugural Address of Cecil H. Underwood, 1957
Inaugural Address of Cecil H. Underwood, 1997

|-

|-

|-

|-

1922 births
2008 deaths
Republican Party governors of West Virginia
People from Tyler County, West Virginia
West Virginia University alumni
Salem International University alumni
Schoolteachers from West Virginia
Military personnel from West Virginia
Bethany College (West Virginia)
20th-century American politicians
21st-century American politicians
American United Methodist clergy
20th-century American educators
20th-century American clergy